Angelo Spanio (October 4, 1939 in Venice – October 1, 1999) was an Italian professional football player.

He played for 3 seasons (28 games, 3 goals) in the Serie A for A.C. Torino and A.S. Roma.

See also
Football in Italy
List of football clubs in Italy

References

External links
 Career summary by playerhistory.com

1939 births
1999 deaths
Italian footballers
Serie A players
F.C. Pro Vercelli 1892 players
Parma Calcio 1913 players
Torino F.C. players
S.S.C. Napoli players
A.S. Roma players
A.C. Cesena players
Spezia Calcio players
Association football midfielders